Halvor Rødølen Opsahl (born 8 October 2002) is a Norwegian footballer who plays as a defender for HamKam.

Career
Opsahl played youth football at Roterud and Lillehammer, before starting his senior career with the latter in 2019. He moved to HamKam in 2021. On 10 April 2022, he made his Eliteserien debut in a 2–1 loss against Tromsø.

References

External links

2002 births
Living people
Sportspeople from Lillehammer
Association football defenders
Norwegian footballers
Norway youth international footballers
Hamarkameratene players
Norwegian Fourth Division players
Norwegian First Division players
Eliteserien players